Avenir sportif de La Marsa Volleyball Club (Arabic: نادي المستقبل الرياضي بالمرسي للكرة الطائرة, English: El Marsa Future Association Club or ASM) is a Tunisian men's Volleyball team based in La Marsa, Tunis Town and is one of AS Marsa men's main Section, Since the year 1944 and it is currently playing in the Tunisian Men's Volleyball League Top Division, The Club have a huge success they won the Tunisian Championship in 7 occasions and also they have won the Tunisian Volleyball Cup crown 8 times, 4 of them are consecutive.

Honours

National titles 

 Tunisian Volleyball League 7 :
 Champions :  1961–62, 1962–63, 1969–70, 1970–71, 1972–73, 1974–75, 1979–80
 Vice Champion :

 Tunisian Volleyball Cup 8 :
 Champions : 1961–62, 1962–63, 1967–68, 1968–69, 1969–70, 1970–71, 1972–73, 1987–88
 Runners Up : 1963–64, 1979–80, 1980–81, 1988–89

Current squad 2017–18

Head coaches 
This is a list of the senior team's head coaches in the recent years.

As of 2018

Notable players

See also 
AS Marsa
AS Marsa Women's Volleyball

References

External links 
 Official Website
 Official Facebook Page

Tunisian volleyball clubs
Volleyball clubs established in 1944
1944 establishments in Tunisia